is a village located in Hachijō Subprefecture, Tokyo Metropolis, Japan. , the village had an estimated population of 169, and a population density of 28.2 persons per km2.

Geography
Aogashima is the least populous municipality in the whole of Japan. Warmed by the Kuroshio Current, the town has a warmer and wetter climate than central Tokyo.

Neighboring municipalities
Tokyo Metropolis
Hachijō, Tokyo
Ogasawara, Tokyo

History
It is uncertain when human settlement first began on Aogashima, but the island was known to be inhabited in the early Edo period, and is mentioned in historical records kept by the Tokugawa shogunate in Hachijōjima. During a major volcanic eruption in 1785, a large number of islanders perished, and the remainder were evacuated to Hachijōjima. An 1835 census reported  241 inhabitants (133 men, 108 women), mostly engaged in fishing.

On April 1, 1940, the island came under the administrative jurisdiction of Hachijō Subprefecture.

Economy
Fishing and subsistence agriculture are the mainstays of the economy of Aogashima, with a small number of tourists and sports fishermen providing seasonal income.

Transportation
Due to its lack of natural harbors and strong currents, Aogashima has always been difficult to access. The wharf at the island's only port, Sanbō, can handle small ships of up to 500 tons, and is unusable during times of high waves and inclement weather. Toho Air Service also provides chartered helicopter service to the island from Hachijōjima.

Education
Because Aogashima has a small population, there is one school that is available to elementary and junior high school students.  serves student populations.

Gallery

References

External links

Villages of Tokyo
Populated coastal places in Japan
Izu Islands

sk:Aogašima (ostrov)